The Battle of Assandun (or Essendune) was fought between Danish and English armies on 18 October 1016. There is disagreement whether Assandun may be Ashdon near Saffron Walden in north Essex, England, or, as long supposed and better evidenced, Ashingdon near Rochford in south-east Essex. It ended in victory for the Danes, led by King Cnut, who triumphed over the English army led by King Edmund Ironside. The battle was the conclusion to the Danish conquest of England.

Prelude
On 23 April 1016, King Æthelred the Unready died from an illness that he had been suffering from since the previous year. Two opposing assemblies gathered to name his successor; an assembly of London citizens declared Edmund king and the larger Witan at Southampton declared Cnut as king. During the autumn of 1016, King Edmund raised an army consisting of West-Saxon troops as well as men from Southern England to defeat a Danish force led by King Cnut that had sailed across the Thames into Essex.

Battle
On 18 October, as the Danes returned to their ships, the two forces finally engaged with each other at a place called Assandun, the exact location being disputed. Edmund formed his men into three lines and fought amongst the front lines to encourage his men, while Cnut, more of a strategist than a warrior, did not fight amongst his ranks. During the battle, Eadric Streona, the ealdorman of Mercia, left the battle allowing the Scandinavians to break through the English lines and win a decisive victory. Eadric Streona had previously defected to Cnut when he landed in England but after Cnut's defeat at the Battle of Otford he came back to the English. However, this was a trick, as he again betrayed the English at Assandun.

During the course of the battle, Eadnoth the Younger, Bishop of Dorchester on Thames, was killed by Cnut's men whilst in the act of saying mass on behalf of Edmund Ironside's men. According to the Liber Eliensis, Eadnoth's hand was first cut off for a ring, and then his body cut to pieces. The ealdorman Ulfcytel Snillingr also died in the battle.

Aftermath
Following his defeat, Edmund was forced to sign a treaty with Cnut. By this treaty, all of England except Wessex would be controlled by Cnut and when one of the kings should die the other would take all of England, that king's son being the heir to the throne. After Edmund's death on 30 November, Cnut became the king of all of England. On 18 October 1032, a church at Assandun was consecrated to commemorate the battle and those who had died during it.

Battlefield location
There is another possible location of the battle; Ashdon, also in Essex, or closer to nearby Hadstock. There have been many finds of Roman and Anglo-Saxon coins in the area and the construction of the Saffron Walden to Bartlow branch line through the 'Red Field' between Hadstock and Linton in the 1860s discovered a large number of skeletal remains. Historians have argued inconclusively over the different sites for years. Ashdon's 10th-century wooden village church, itself possibly built on the site of a pre-Christian temple, was probably rebuilt in stone in the early 11th century, about the right time for Cnut's conquest. Little remains of the earlier structures, which were largely obliterated by the construction of the current church of All Saints during the late 13th to early 15th centuries. A possible site for Cnut's church is St Botolph's Church in Hadstock, known to date from the early 11th century, still largely extant, and much closer to an alternative battle site.

Legacy
The battle is mentioned briefly in Knýtlinga saga which quotes a verse of skaldic poetry by Óttarr svarti, one of Cnut's court poets.

In 2016, the one-thousand-year anniversary of the battle was celebrated in Ashingdon with a re-enactment.

Further reading

References

Cnut the Great
Battles involving Essex
Battles involving the Vikings
Battles involving Denmark
Battles involving England
1016 in England
Conflicts in 1016